Gholam Ali Jafar (also Romanized as Gholām ʿAlī Jaʿfar) is a village in Margan Rural District, in the Central District of Hirmand County, Sistan and Baluchestan Province, Iran. At the 2006 census, its population was 114, in 29 families.

References 

Populated places in Hirmand County